An enchanted forest is a forest under or containing magical enchantments. 

Enchanted Forest may also refer to:

Arts and entertainment
 Enchanted Forest, English title for Ewiger Wald, a 1936 German film directed by Hanns Springer and Rolf von Sonjevski-Jamrowski
 The Enchanted Forest (1945 film), a family film
 The Enchanted Forest (1987 film), a Spanish comedy-fantasy film
 The Enchanted Forest (ballet), by Riccardo Drigo
 Enchanted Forest (game), a 1981 board game

Theme parks
 Enchanted Forest (Indiana), a defunct theme park in Chesterton
 Enchanted Forest (Maryland), a defunct theme park in Ellicott City
 Enchanted Forest Water Safari, New York
 Enchanted Forest (Oregon), in Turner
 Enchanted Forest (Rhode Island), a defunct theme park in Hope Valley

See also
 Enchanted Forest Chronicles, a series of four books by Patricia C. Wrede
 The Inchanted Forest, a 1754 work by Francesco Geminiani based on Jerusalem Delivered, an epic poem